Helen K. Garber (born 1954) is an American photographer known mostly for her black-and-white urban landscapes of cities including Los Angeles, San Francisco, New York City, Paris, Amsterdam and Venice. Her images are in the permanent collection of the Brooklyn Museum, Museum of the City of New York, Portland Art Museum, Yale University and the George Eastman House.

Biography
Born and raised in Brooklyn, New York, she earned her bachelor's degree in Theatre Arts, Design at the State University of New York at New Paltz.  She moved to California in 1978 and lives in Santa Monica, California with her husband, Dr. Stuart Garber and two Springer Spaniels.  Her studio is located at Venice Beach, California.

Helen worked in many different art disciplines including theatre scene and costume design, painting, computer animation and video documentary.  In 1991, she produced and directed the video documentary, Shirley Kaufer, Artist.  It was edited by the award-winning filmmaker, Phil Zwickler.  Shirley Kaufer was shown in Los Angeles at the juried Women's Film Festival at Barnsdall Park and on local PBS stations.

Helen focused on still photography in 1991 after she documented Le Cirque du Soleil in Santa Monica, Costa Mesa and New York.

Since Helen lived in the entertainment capital of the world, she specialized in public relations photography. Her portraits were reproduced in many periodicals such as the New York Times, the LA Times, Playbill, The Hollywood Reporter, New York Magazine and the LA Weekly.  Her corporate clients included Hachette Filapecci Publications, The Getty Center, CBS, Penguin, Doubleday and the Mayor's Office, City of Los Angeles. In 1997, Helen won the Photo of the Year Award from the Publicity Club of Los Angeles.

The grand prize money from the national 20th Century Photo Contest was used to build out a studio across from Gold's Gym, Venice.  Helen spent the next five years documenting the visually extreme members of the gym.

One of Helen's last commercial assignments was to appear on the other side of the camera for the Travel Channel in the 30-minute photo travelogue, Freeze Frame San Diego. She accompanied TV personality, Bill Boggs on adventures throughout San Diego County, while teaching him photo technique tips. The photos taken during the adventures were reproduced in American Photo, Travel Holiday and Popular Photography magazines.

Helen was hired by Random House to illustrate the 1998 best selling book, Parents at Last, the New Pathways to Parenthood. She and her husband Stuart (then on sabbatical), traveled around the country documenting 35 families who were created in non-traditional ways.

Helen switched to fine art photography in 2000 and has had her work exhibited in venues such as AIPAD, NY, Photo L.A., Photo New York, UBS Paine Webber Gallery, NY, The Norton Museum, West Palm Beach, FL, Hermes Gallery, Beverly Hills, Kathleen Ewing Gallery, Washington, DC, Paul Kopeikin Gallery and G. Ray Hawkins Gallery, Los Angeles.  She is represented in Los Angeles by DNJ Gallery, in New York by Marla Hamburg Kennedy, and in Boston by Tepper Takayama Fine Arts.

The Santa Monica Arts Commission, The Venice Community Trust, Women In Photography, International, Focus On AIDS and the International Photography Awards are a number of the organizations that Helen either has advised or sat on the board.  In 2006, Helen curated FOH, a show of photography for Ocean Front Gallery at Venice Beach, California.

Since 2008, she has been directing a group photography installation, An Intimate View. Seeing that her many photographer friends were reeling from the change in direction of the business of photography as well experiencing the economic slump, she organized a group project where the photographers would document their neighborhoods over the course of the year and then present the stories in the latest digital technology.  The first group, GroupSC 2008, An Intimate View of Los Angeles premiered at Gallery Skart along with the opening night of the first Month of Photography, Los Angeles.  The MINARC designed installation using 25 photo screens telling the stories simultaneously was critically acclaimed and invited to re-install at the international Los Angeles Art Show, in January, 2010.  This would be the first time that photographers would work together as a group rather than compete against each other as they normally do.  The strength of the whole, as well as the talent and the passion of the group members, was the essence of this successful collaboration.

The second year group expanded to 45 artists and a territory from Santa Ynez to San Diego and East to Palm Springs.  GroupSC 2009, An Intimate View of Southern California will premiere April 3, 2010, in conjunction with opening night of Month of Photography, 2010.

Major works

L.A. Noir
Nominated for the 2006 Santa Fe Prize in Photography, L.A. Noir is a multi-media installation consisting of projected images of Helen's night urban landscapes of Los Angeles, text from pulp fiction based in Los Angeles using the city as character and West Coast Sound Jazz.

The recorded version was first shown at The Venice Art Walk, Venice, CA in 2005 and on Wednesday, April 19, 2006 at Sponto Gallery, Venice, CA, and again at The Venice Art Walk in 2006, CA.

Urban Noir/NY-LA
A multimedia piece including projected images, text extracted from pulp fiction and mid twentieth-century jazz along with 20 of Helen's photographic prints was exhibited at the Samuel Dorsky Museum of Art at the State University at New Paltz, NY, October 2007. The University purchased the twenty images exhibited for the permanent collection of the Samuel Dorsky Museum of Art. John Beasley, noted jazz artist, composed a 17-minute suite to accompany the projected images and text. John performed the piece live for the first time in a multi-media presentation of Urban Noir/LA-NY after Helen lectured at the Annenberg Space for Photography in June 2009. It was part of the first group of lectures presented at the recently completed institution.

A Night View of Los Angeles, a 360 Degree Panorama of the Entire City of Los Angeles as Seen from the Helipad of the US Bank Tower

A Night View Collaboration

Helen's vision was to then invite the most significant Los Angeles graffiti writers of the past twenty years to share her privileged view of the city and catch (paint) her . long masterpiece with their own distinctive street art identities (TAGS). To ceremoniously tag the entire city at once. This was first exhibited at the annual charity event, the [Venice Art Walk http://veniceartwalk.info], on May 20, 2007. The Night View Collaboration was exhibited a second time in conjunction with An Intimate View of Los Angeles, at Gallery Skart, Santa Monica, April 2009. Again as part of the Santa Monica Pico Art Walk in 2009 and finally at the FADA Los Angeles Art Show, January 2010.  
 
Helen K. Garber, a noirist, feels a camaraderie with graffiti writers as she and they roam the city after dark while sometimes forsaking their physical safety, to use the urban landscape to create their art. They all share a love for the city of Los Angeles. Despite their differences in age, gender and background, they were able to communicate as equals because of their mutual respect for each other as serious artists.

Duce One designed the collaboration and invited Mear, Saber, Gin, Retna, Gzer, Vyal, Revok, Zes, and Cab to join him. This is the first time so many of these significant artists collaborated on the same production. Vyal gave Helen a lesson in good spray can technique and she added her own tag to complete the collaboration. In 2010, for the FADA Los Angeles Art Show, Duce again invited more writers to add their tags and Duce, Cre8, Mear and Vyal finished the piece during the art show, three years after it was begun.
  
This project opened up a dialogue between Helen and these fellow artists and has given the writers a forum to explain their process. Not only do large corporations support this group's work, the writers are presently in conversation with the Los Angeles Dept. of Cultural Affairs about creating murals for the city.  Instead of considering them outlaws, the city hopes to support them for creating the same type of work.

Why? - Young artists rarely tag these artist's murals because their style is well known and respected. The young, ignorant artists generally tag murals that they can't relate to in the hopes that their tag will remain longer on a mural than on a plain wall that can be simply painted over.
 
While most view territorial gang tagging as urban blight, Helen views it no worse than billboards, electric wires, thoughtless development over the years such as fortress-like indoor shopping malls and McMansions created with much money, but no aesthetic sense. 
 
Imagine how more beautiful our cities can be if art programs were re-introduced to the public school system with an added emphasis on the appreciation of the urban landscape. That way future taggers, developers and landlords would create with a better understanding of design and aesthetics.

Venice/Venezia

Premiered at DNJ Gallery, Los Angeles, in 2010, Venice/Venezia is a series of black and white diptychs on stretched canvas that create a metaphor by illustrating the duality of life in two distant cities that share the same name. Although the night images are beautiful to view, they are a sugar coated comment on how the residents of tourist destinations must share their lives with hordes of unwanted day tourists and then take back their beloved cities once the sunsets.

Photography
 Griffith Park Observatory 1997 
 Radio Tower, Empire State 1997
 World Trade Center from Empire State 1997
 Bike Path Fog 2001  
 Speedway Alley 2001
 LAX 2002
 Santa Monica Pier Fog 1 2002
 Santa Monica Pier Fog 2 2002
 Chinatown Art Opening 2003
 Paris Walk Street 2003
 Los Angeles Panoramic 2 2005
 Disney Hall and Music Center from US Bank Tower 2005
A Night View of Los Angeles 2006

A Night View Collaboration 2007–2010

GroupLA 2008, An Intimate View of Los Angeles 2009

GroupSC 2009, An Intimate View of Southern CA 2010

Books

Films
 Shirley Kaufer, Artist 1990
 L.A. Noir 2005
"Urban Noir - LA/NY" 2009

References

 Sight Photo Article with photos
 The Nocturnes Article with photos
 Antilipseis Magazine, September, 2006 Article with photos
 Women in Photography Article with photos
Palm Springs Life Article with photos
Globe Gallery, London Photo Awards
Focus Magazine Article with photos, April, 2006
Review: Night Lights:Venice/Venezia
Forth Magazine: Review: Night Lights:Venice/Venezia
Fine Arts LA Magazine: Review: Night Lights:Venice/Venezia
Arts Scene Magazine: Review:Night Lights:Venice/Venezia
Art. Ltd. Magazine: Review: Night Lights:Venice/Venezia
Article:Urban Noir/LA-NY 1a1 Photo Magazine

External links
Helen K. Garber's website
DNJ Gallery Garber's Los Angeles representative
Tepper Takayama Fine Arts - Garber's Boston representative
Gallery Skart: GroupLA 2008 website An Intimate View of Los Angeles Group Installation
Gallery Skart: GroupSC 2009 website An Intimate View of Southern California Installation

American photographers
1954 births
Living people
People from Brooklyn
Artists from Santa Monica, California
State University of New York at New Paltz alumni
American women photographers
21st-century American women